Mario Mattoli (30 November 1898 – 26 February 1980) was an Italian film director and screenwriter. He directed 86 films between 1934 and 1966.

His 1939 film Defendant, Stand Up! was shown as part of a retrospective on Italian comedy at the 67th Venice International Film Festival.

Filmography

 Full Speed (1934)
 I Love You Only (1935)
 The Man Who Smiles (1936)
 Sette giorni all'altro mondo (1936)
 La damigella di Bard (1936)
Music in the Square (1936)
 The Last Days of Pompeo (1937)
 These Children (1937)
 Felicità Colombo (1937)
 Destiny (1938)
 Triumph of Love (1938)
 Nonna Felicità (1938)
 A Lady Did It (1938)
 The Lady in White (1938)
 We Were Seven Sisters (1939)
 At Your Orders, Madame (1939)
 We Were Seven Widows (1939)
 Defendant, Stand Up! (1939)
 Mille chilometri al minuto! (1939)
 Lo vedi come sei... lo vedi come sei? (1939)
 Abandonment (1940)
 The Pirate's Dream (1940)
 Non me lo dire! (1940)
 Light in the Darkness (1941)
 Schoolgirl Diary (1941)
 I Live as I Please (1942)
 Invisible Chains (1942)
 The Three Pilots (1942)
 The Lady Is Fickle (1942)
 Labbra serrate (1942)
 Stasera niente di nuovo (1942)
 La valle del diavolo (1943)
 Lively Teresa (1943)
 Anything for a Song (1943)
 The Last Wagon (1943)
 The Za-Bum Circus (1944)
 Life Begins Anew (1945)
 Departure at Seven (1946)
 The Two Orphans (1947)
 Toto Tours Italy (1948)
 Fear and Sand (1948)
 Cab Number 13 (1948)
 Assunta Spina (1948)
 Little Lady (1949)
 The Firemen of Viggiù (1949)
 Adam and Eve (1949)
 Totò Tarzan (1950)
 The Merry Widower (1950)
The Elusive Twelve (1950)
 The Cadets of Gascony (1950)
 Toto the Sheik (1950)
 Toto the Third Man (1951)
 The Steamship Owner (1951)
 Arrivano i nostri (1951)
 My Heart Sings (1951)
 Accidents to the Taxes!! (1951)
 Five Paupers in an Automobile (1952)
 Sardinian Vendetta (1952)
 Neapolitan Turk (1953)
 Siamo tutti inquilini (1953)
 Funniest Show on Earth (1953)
 Two Nights with Cleopatra (1954)
 Toto Seeks Peace (1954)
 The Doctor of the Mad (1954)
 Poverty and Nobility (1954)
 L'ultimo amante (1955)
 Eighteen Year Olds (1955)
 I giorni più belli (1956)
 Peppino, le modelle e chella là (1957)
 Toto, Peppino and the Fanatics (1958)
 Move and I'll Shoot (1958)
 Tipi da spiaggia (1959)
 Prepotenti più di prima (1959)
 Non perdiamo la testa (1959)
 Guardatele ma non toccatele (1959)
 Gentlemen Are Born (1960)
 Un mandarino per Teo (1960)
 Appuntamento a Ischia (1960)
 Toto, Fabrizi and the Young People Today (1960)
 Sua Eccellenza si fermò a mangiare (1961)
 Hercules in the Valley of Woe (1961)
 Appuntamento in Riviera (1962)
 5 marines per 100 ragazze (1962)
 Obiettivo ragazze (1963)
 Corpse for the Lady (1964)
 For a Few Dollars Less (1966)

References

External links
 

1898 births
1980 deaths
Italian film directors
Comedy film directors
Parody film directors
Italian parodists
20th-century Italian screenwriters
Italian male screenwriters
People from the Province of Macerata
20th-century Italian male writers